Park Se-Hak was a South Korean association football player.
He retired from Korea Tungsten Company FC in 1968. 
After 8 years, He was returned to as manager of Navy FC.
Under his management, Navy FC became a strong team and won many championships.

Park Se-Hak appointed the first manager of Lucky-Goldstar Hwangso in August 1983, 
In his second season (1985), Lucky-Goldstar Hwangso won first K-League title

Honours

Manager
Lucky-Goldstar Hwangso
 K-League: 1985

Lucky-Goldstar Hwangso
 K-League Manager of the Year Award: 1985

References

South Korean footballers
South Korean football managers
FC Seoul managers
K League 1 managers
1936 births
Living people
Association football midfielders
Footballers from Seoul